Edward Curtiss Colver (born 1949), also known as Ed Colver, is an American photographer, best known for his early punk photographs.

Overview 
Colver not only created a visual document of the birth of the hardcore punk in suburban Southern California from late 1978 to mid-1984, but also he greatly helped in defining the photography style and graphic identity of the American hardcore punk movement.

He was actually in the right place at the right time, and with the right attitude, but he was not merely a witness in the eye of the storm, he was indeed a living part of that big picture, and in this regard, his early work is an authentic self-portrait of the Southern California hardcore punk scene in its golden years.

His work was featured extensively in the book American Hardcore: A Tribal History (2001), written by Steven Blush, and in its documentary film version, American Hardcore (2006), directed by Paul Rachman.

Early life and family 
A third-generation Southern Californian born on June 17, 1949, in Pomona, California, Colver was named after an ancestor who arrived in the United States from Cornwall, England, in 1635. Edward's father, Charles Colver, was a forest ranger for 43 years. Upon his retirement, Charles was presented with the Theodore Roosevelt Conservation Award by President George H. W. Bush at the White House. The tallest peak southwest of Mount San Antonio aka Mount Baldy, was named Colver Peak after Charles.

Photography 
Essentially a self-taught photographer, Colver had a brief formal training during night classes at University of California, Los Angeles, where he studied beginning photography with Eileen Cowin. Largely influenced by Dada and Surrealism, Colver was most impressed in his early years by the art of Southern Californian native Edward Kienholz. In the late 1960s, Edward's perspective on life and art was changed by his exposure to composers such as Edgard Varèse, Karlheinz Stockhausen, Krzysztof Penderecki and John Cage.

Three months after he began taking photographs, Colver had his first photograph published: an image of performance artist Johanna Went, featured in BAM magazine. Since then he has shot photographs for dozens of record labels including EMI, Capitol and Geffen. His pictures have been featured on more than 500 album covers and include some of the most recognizable and iconic covers of the punk era.

Selected cover art contributions

See also 

 List of photographers
 List of University of California, Los Angeles people
 Punk rock in California

Notes

References

Further reading 
 Colver, Edward (2006). Blight at the End of The Funnel. Last Gasp. .
 Blush, Steven (2001). American Hardcore: A Tribal History. Second ed., 2010. Feral House. .

Further viewing 
 Sample, Jack (2012). Contact Print: Edward Colver (documentary). The Film & Television Conservatory of the Orange County School of the Arts. Online at YouTube.

External links 

 "Pivotal Punk Rock Photographer Edward Colver Visits FIDM’s Graphic Design Portfolio Presentation". Fashion Institute of Design & Merchandising.
 Frankel, Ricky; Wisniewski, Kira (November 26, 2014). "Interviews: Edward Colver". Punknews.
 Dr. Martens (April 2, 2015). "Punks in the Pit: An Interview with Edward Colver". Dr. Martens Blog.
 Caracola Gallery (October 22, 2006). In the Pit: The photos of Edward Colver (documentary). YouTube.
 "Photogallery". Edward Colver (official website).
 "Photography for Album Covers". Edward Colver (official website).
 Edward Colver, discography. Discogs.

Punk people
Rock music photographers
1949 births
Living people
Artists from Los Angeles
Photographers from California
People from Pomona, California
University of California, Los Angeles alumni
20th-century American photographers
21st-century American photographers